Association Spectra () is a grassroots organization that works on promotion and protection of human rights of trans*, gender diverse and intersex persons in Montenegro. It was founded in 2017 as a spin-off from the organization Queer Montenegro. The organization works in the field of community support, advocacy, education, media and culture. 

In recent years it advanced its public visibility and impact by signing multiple agreements with international organizations like the United Nations High Commissioner for Refugees, Eurasian Key Populations Health Network, Stonewall and public institutions especially in the field of healthcare.

Asocijacija Spektra is a member of multiple networks including Transgender Europe, the Equal Rights Association for Western Balkans and Turkey and the International Lesbian, Gay, Bisexual, Transgender and Queer Youth and Student Organisation.

References

External links 

Youtube channel
Stonewall interview

2017 establishments in Montenegro
LGBT in Montenegro
Intersex organizations
Queer culture
Transgender in Europe

Non-profit organizations based in Europe